Fariña is a last name, held by many people. 

 The death of Carlos Fariña in 1973 is a Chilean political scandal
 Leonardo Fariña, Argentine TV personality
 Luis Fariña, Argentine football player
 Mimi Fariña, American singer
 Richard Fariña, American writer and folksinger

Other uses
 Fariña (TV series), a 2018 Spanish TV series